The 2020–21 Cal State Bakersfield Roadrunners men's basketball team represented California State University, Bakersfield during the 2020–21 NCAA Division I men's basketball season. The team was led by tenth-year head coach Rod Barnes, and played their home games at Icardo Center in Bakersfield, California as a first-year member of the Big West Conference.

Previous season
The Roadrunners finished the season 12–19, 6–10 in WAC play to finish in seventh place. They were set to be the No. 7 seed in the WAC tournament, however, the tournament was cancelled amid the COVID-19 pandemic.

2019–20 was the final year in the WAC for the Roadrunners, as they joined the Big West Conference on July 1, 2020.

Roster

Schedule and results

|-
!colspan=12 style=| Non-conference regular season

|-
!colspan=12 style=| Big West regular season

|-
!colspan=12 style=| Big West tournament
|-

References

Cal State Bakersfield Roadrunners men's basketball seasons
Cal State Bakersfield Roadrunners
Cal State Bakersfield Roadrunners men's basketball
Cal State Bakersfield Roadrunners men's basketball